Oenocarpus simplex is a species of flowering plant in the family Arecaceae. It is found only in Colombia and Panama.

References

simplex
Data deficient plants
Endemic flora of Colombia
Taxonomy articles created by Polbot